John Vitty (19 January 1923 – 4 November 2021) was an English footballer who played as a left-back in The Football League.

Vitty died on 4 November 2021, at the age of 98.

References

External links

1923 births
2021 deaths
English footballers
Association football defenders
Charlton Athletic F.C. players
Brighton & Hove Albion F.C. players
South Shields F.C. (1936) players
Workington A.F.C. players
English Football League players
People from Chilton, County Durham
Footballers from County Durham